Ashan may refer to:

Places 
Ashan, Nagorno-Karabakh, a village in Martuni Province, Artsakh
Ashan, Iran, a village in East Azerbaijan Province, Iran
Ashan, Isfahan, a village in Isfahan Province, Iran
Ashan Rural District, in Isfahan Province, Iran

People 
Ashan Jeevanathan (born 2005)
Damidu Ashan (born 1995), Sri Lankan cricketer
Shammu Ashan (born 1998), Sri Lankan cricketer
Ashan Fernando (born 1982), Sri Lankan cricketer
Ashan Holgate (born 1986), footballer
Ashan Pillai (born 1969), British violist
Ashan Priyanjan (born 1989), professional Sri Lankan cricketer
Ashan Randika (born 1993), Sri Lankan cricketer

Other uses 
Ashan, a planet in the Ubisoft continuity of the fictional Might and Magic universe

See also 
Auchan, a French supermarket chain